Nabil Ayers is an American music industry entrepreneur, author and musician.

Ayers' debut memoir, My Life in the Sunshine, was published by Viking Press on June 7, 2022. The book focuses on Ayers' relationship with his father, the jazz musician Roy Ayers, growing up as a mixed-race person in America, and Ayers' life in the music industry. The title, My Life in the Sunshine, is a reference to the Roy Ayers song, "Everybody Loves the Sunshine." In a June 4, 2022 CBS Saturday Morning segment, Ayers, when asked about how the memoir portrays his father, stated, "In the end, it's positive. It's about all the great things he's given me, even though he hasn't been part of my life." My Life in the Sunshine has received accolades from author/musician, Michelle Zauner, who said the book "ultimately redefines what it means to be a family." Ashley C. Ford, John Hodgman also gave praise, and Rolling Stone, called the book "[an] affecting new memoir."

As a writer, Ayers is a frequent contributor to The New York Times, NPR, Pitchfork, Rolling Stone, People, GQ, Huffington Post, and The Root, among others. His writing is often autobiographic, and touches on topics of music and race.

With over 30 years of experience in the music industry, Ayers is the current U.S. President of the UK-based Beggars Group of record labels, assuming the role in early 2022 after his work for 4AD where he had served as the label's U.S. General Manager since 2009. While with 4AD, he led album campaigns for Grimes, Big Thief, St. Vincent, Purity Ring, Deerhunter, Tune-Yards, Future Islands, The Breeders, and The National, whose album Sleep Well Beast won the 2018 Grammy Award for Best Alternative Music Album. Ayers sits on the Recording Academy's Board of Trustees, and previously served as a two-term elected Governor. Ayers is continually named one of Billboard Magazine's Indie Power Players, earning a spot on the list each year from 2019-2022.

Ayers co-founded Seattle’s Sonic Boom Records store with his business partner, Jason Hughes in 1997. Sonic Boom has been named one of the best record stores in America by Rolling Stone, The Wall Street Journal and SPIN Magazine, and has been profiled by NPR, The New York Times and The Seattle Times. In July 2016, it was announced that Sonic Boom Records was sold to a longtime customer.  After the sale, Ayers wrote a memoir about the store that was published in Seattle newspaper, The Stranger.

In 2002, Ayers founded the independent record label The Control Group where he has released music by Lykke Li, Cate Le Bon, and El Perro del Mar. In 2018, Ayers founded the independent record label Valley of Search to reissue his uncle Alan Braufman's album of the same name. The label has gone on to release music by Tomas Nordmark and Patricia Brennan. As a drummer, he has performed with various acts, most recently The Long Winters and Tommy Stinson.

He currently resides in Brooklyn, NY, where Brooklyn Magazine named Ayers #7 in a list of "The 100 Most Influential People In Brooklyn Culture.”

External links
Nabil Ayers Official Site
4AD
Valley of Search Official Site
The Control Group Official Site
Sonic Boom Records Official Site

References

Living people
American rock drummers
Year of birth missing (living people)
The Long Winters members
Musicians from New York City
Musicians from Seattle
Alien Crime Syndicate members